Hugh Garner (February 22, 1913 – June 30, 1979) was a British-born Canadian novelist.

Biography

Early life
Hugh Garner was born on February 22, 1913, in Batley, Yorkshire, England. He came to Canada in 1919 with his parents, and was raised in Toronto, Ontario where he attended Danforth Technical High School.

During the Great Depression, he rode the rails in both Canada and the United States, and then joined the International Brigades in the Spanish Civil War. During World War II he served in the Royal Canadian Navy.

Career
Following the war, Garner concentrated on his writing. He published his first novel, Storm Below, in 1949. Garner's most famous novel, Cabbagetown, depicted life in the Toronto neighbourhood of Cabbagetown, then Canada's most famous slum, during the Depression. It was published in abridged form in 1950, and in an expanded edition in 1968. The Intruders, a sequel depicting the gentrification of the neighbourhood, was published in 1976.

Later in his career, he concentrated on mystery novels, including Death in Don Mills (1975) and Murder Has Your Number (1978).

His background (poor, urban, Protestant) is rare for a Canadian writer of his time. It is nevertheless, the foundation for his writing. His theme is working-class Ontario; the realistic novel his preferred genre. Cabbagetown is the best-known example of his style. His focus on the victimization of the worker reflects his socialist roots.

In 1963, he won the Governor General's Award for his collection of short stories entitled Hugh Garner's Best Stories. Garner struggled much of his life with alcoholism, and died in 1979 of alcohol-related illness. A housing cooperative in Cabbagetown is named in his memory.

Death
He died on June 30, 1979.

Works

Novels

Storm Below (1949)
Waste No Tears (1950) (as "Jarvis Warwick")
Cabbagetown (first published in abridged form in 1950; restored version published in 1968)
Present Reckoning (1951)
The Silence On The Shore (1962)
The Sin Sniper (1970)
A Nice Place to Visit (1970)
Death in Don Mills (1975)
The Intruders (1976; something of a sequel to Cabbagetown)
Murder Has Your Number (1978)
Don't Deal Five Deuces (1992; novel completed by Paul Steuwe after Garner's death)

Short fiction

The Yellow Sweater (1952)
Hugh Garner's Best Stories (1963; winner of the 1963 Governor General's Award)
Men and Women (1966)
Violation of the Virgins (1971)
One Mile of Ice
The Moose and the Sparrow (1966)
The Father (1958)

Prose

Author, Author! (1964; essays)
One Damned Thing After Another! (1973; memoir)

Biographical Works

Steuwe, Paul, 1988.The Storms Below: The Turbulent Life and Times of Hugh Garner.  Toronto: James Lorimer.

References

External links
 Hugh Garner fonds at Queen's University Archives

1913 births
1979 deaths
Canadian Anglicans
Canadian mystery writers
Canadian male novelists
Canadian male short story writers
British emigrants to Canada
People from Batley
Writers from Toronto
Governor General's Award-winning fiction writers
Toronto in fiction
International Brigades personnel
Canadian people of the Spanish Civil War
Alcohol-related deaths in Canada
20th-century Canadian novelists
20th-century Canadian short story writers